Teunis is a Dutch masculine given name. Like Theunis, it is a derivative of Antonius (Anthony). It is also considered a diminutive form of Antonius, Anton, Antoon, Anthonis, Anthoon, Antonie, and Antonis used in Belgium, Netherlands, Suriname, South Africa, Namibia, and Indonesia.  Its popularity as a birth name has dropped since the middle of the last century, taken over partially by its short form Teun. People with the name include:

 Teunis G. Bergen (1806–1881), United States Representative from New York.
  (1927–2014), Dutch Old Catholic bishop
 Teunis Jacob (1927–2009), Dutch wall painter and sculptor
 Teunis Kloek (born 1934), Dutch economist
  (1884–1965), Dutch chemist
 Teunis Mulder (born 1955), Dutch-born Australian politician
 Teunis Mulder (born 1981), Dutch track cyclist
 Teunis Nieuwoudt (born 1991), South African rugby player
 Teunis Sprong (1889–1971), Dutch long-distance runner
  (1837–1902), Dutch physician

See also

References 

Dutch masculine given names